Snowboy (a.k.a. Mark Cotgrove) is an English percussionist, bandleader, DJ and journalist.

Discography

Albums
 Ritmo Snowbo (Acid Jazz, 1989)
 Descarga Mambito (Acid Jazz, 1991)
 Something's Coming (Acid Jazz, 1993)
 Pit Bull Latin Jazz (Acid Jazz, 1995)
 The Soul of Snowboy (Acid Jazz, 1995)
 Mambo Rage (Ubiquity, 1998)
 Afro Cuban Jazz (Ubiquity, 2000)
 The Hi-Hat: The True Jazz Dance Sessions (Ocho, 2000)
 Para Puente (Ubiquity, 2002)
 New Beginnings (Chillifunk, 2004)
 Communications (Freestyle, 2009)
 New York Afternoon (Snowboy Records, 2016)

Singles
 Bring on the Beat / When Snowboys Rocking the Mike / Guaguanco R.J.
 Mambo Teresa / Wild Spirit
 A Night in Tunisia / Ritmo Snowbo (Waterfront)
 Ritmo Snowbo / A Night in Tunisia (BGP)
 Snowboy's House of Latin
 Give Me the Sunshine / El Nuevo Latino
 Lucky Fellow / Astralisation
 Delirium / NyQuist Theorem
 Three Faces of Snowboy – Girl Overboard / Funky Djembe / 24 for Betty Page
 Where Is the Love?
 The New Avengers
 Jazzakuti
 Casa Forte
 Oya Ye Ye
 Los Rumberos De La Habana Y Matanzas/Baraggo
 It's About Time – DR Bob Jones and The Interns (featuring Snowboy)
 El Padrino 
 I've Got to Learn to Mambo feat. James Hunter
 New York Afternoon feat. Marc Evans

Books
 From Jazz Funk & Fusion to Acid Jazz: The History of the UK Jazz Dance Scene (2009), Chaser Publications (print-on-demand via AuthorHouse),

References

External links
 
 Snowboy interview by Michael 'The Dood' Edwards, UK Vibe, June 2009

Year of birth missing (living people)
Living people
British jazz musicians
Ubiquity Records artists
British percussionists
British music critics
Incognito (band) members
Acid Jazz Records artists